Cornelis Kick (bapt. 12 March 1634, in Amsterdam – 18 June 1681, in Amsterdam) was a Dutch Golden Age painter.

Biography
Kick was trained by his father, then painter Simon Kick, who painted prestigious schuttersstukken. Cornelis Kick is recorded as a painter from 1650 and specialized in flower still lifes, in then manner of his teacher Jan Davidsz de Heem. He married Cornelia Spaeroogh on 5 May 1661, and married a second time with Maghteltje Dirkx of Leiden on 16 December 1674. His pupils were Elias van den Broeck (from August 1665) and Jacob van Walscapelle.

According to Houbraken, Kick married the daughter of the pawnbroker Spaaroog of the Bank van Lening, whose father had a garden outside the St Anthony's gate of Amsterdam. It was here that he painted flowers from nature with his student Jakob van Walskapel, until the expansion of the city in 1657-1663 claimed the land the garden was on and so forced him to move his garden further eastwards to the new polder called Diemermeer. When Kick got it into his head to move to Loenen in 1667 however, Walskapel left his service and moved back to Amsterdam, where he took up another profession and was still living at the time Houbraken was writing (he was probably Houbraken's source).

References

Cornelis Kick on Artnet

1634 births
1681 deaths
Dutch Golden Age painters
Dutch male painters
Painters from Amsterdam
Flower artists